Tropidurus azurduyae is a species of lizard of the Tropiduridae family. It is found in Bolivia.

References

Tropidurus
Reptiles described in 2018
Reptiles of Bolivia
Endemic fauna of Bolivia